Freda Thompson  (5 April 1909 – 11 December 1980) was a pioneer aviator, the first Australian woman to fly solo from the United Kingdom to Australia.

Early life
Born at South Yarra, Melbourne Victoria to parents Frederick and Martha Thompson. Thompson was educated at Toorak College in Melbourne leaving with Honours, Proficiency Certificates Pianoforte and Ice Skating.

Flying qualification and early career 
On 28 May 1930 she did Thompson took her first flight as a pilot and later in that year obtained her A Licence. In 1932 she obtained her 'B' Commercial Pilot licence and became the fifth woman in Australia to hold that license. She qualified as a flying instructor in 1933 and was reported as the first woman in the British Empire to obtain instructors licence.

In April 1934 Thompson sailed for England to collect a new De Havilland Moth Major, which she named Christopher Robin. It had been fitted with long range fuel tanks for the journey to Australia. Thompson had accumulated over 250 hours of flying experience by this time. On 28 September 1934 Freda left Lympne, Kent for the long journey to Australia flying solo. The trip took 39 days with the actual flying time being 19 days. Thompson damaged her aeroplane G-ACUC (VH-UUC) when she made a precautionary landing at Megara, Greece, the flight to Australia was delayed by 20 days waiting for a spare part for a damaged wing. Freda arrived in Darwin on 6 November, and at Mascot, Sydney on 20 November 1934.

WWII 
Thompson was commandant of the Woman's Air Training Corps in Victoria from 1940–1942. During the course of WWII she applied to join the Women's Auxiliary Australian Air Force but did not receive a response and in 1942 she enlisted in the Australian Women's Army Service.

Later career 
Following WWII Thompson bought a de Havilland Hornet Moth, and named it Christopher Robin II. She flew extensively within Australia, and in 1952 to the Territory of Papua and New Guinea. She competed in air races and formation-flying events. She won forty-seven trophies. She was president in 1948 of the Royal Victorian Aero Club. By 1980 she had logged 3330 flying hours.

Death 
Thompson died at Malvern in 1980 and was cremated.

Awards & Legacy 
In 1937 Thompson was awarded King George VI's coronation medal and in 1953 she was awarded Queen Elizabeth II's coronation medal. In 1937 Thompson was appointed an Officer of the Order of the British Empire (OBE).

Thompson's papers were donated to the National Library of Australia in 1990, and the collection includes her 1930s air pilot's cap and googles.

In 1994 she was honoured by the issue of a postage stamp by Australia Post, one of a series depicting Australian aviators also including Stanley Goble and Ivor McIntyre, Lawrence Hargrave, Sir Keith and Sir Ross Macpherson Smith. Thompson was inducted onto the Victorian Honour Roll of Women in 2001.

Sources

Thompson's papers were donated to the National Library of Australia in 1990 her sister, Claire Embling

Further reading

1909 births
1980 deaths
Australian aviators
Aviators from Melbourne
Australian Officers of the Order of the British Empire
Australian women aviators
20th-century Australian women
People from South Yarra, Victoria